Louis Felix Danner Mahoney (8 September 1938 – 28 June 2020) was a Gambian-born British actor, based in Hampstead in London. He was an anti-racist activist and long-time campaigner for racial equality within the acting profession. He represented African-Asian members on the council of the actors' union, Equity, becoming joint Vice-President between 1994 and 1996.

Early life
Mahoney was born in Bathurst (now Banjul), the Gambia in 1938, the eldest of six children to James Mahoney and Princess (née Danner). Mahoney attended the Methodist Boys' High School. In 1957, he moved to England to study medicine at University College London. He also joined the university's cricket team and played for Essex and Ilford. However, he left to pursue drama at the (now Royal) Central School of Speech and Drama in the 1960s.

Career
After graduating, Mahoney worked with Colchester Rep and the Mercury Theatre before joining the Royal Shakespeare Company in 1967 – he was one of the first black actors in the Company. He worked regularly on the stage throughout his career including shows at the National Theatre, Young Vic, Royal Court, Almeida and his final stage performances were in Alan Bennett's Allelujah! at the Bridge Theatre in 2018.
 
He helped found Performers Against Racism in the 1980s to campaign against apartheid in South Africa and was Joint Vice President of Equity between 1994 and 1996.

He had been seen most frequently on television in series such as: Danger Man, Dixon of Dock Green, Z-Cars, Special Branch, The Troubleshooters, Menace, Special Branch, Doctor Who (in the stories Frontier in Space, Planet of Evil and Blink), Quiller, Fawlty Towers (as Dr Finn in The Germans, 1975), The Professionals (as Dr Henry in the episode "Klansmen", never transmitted on terrestrial TV in the UK, and in "Black Out", again as a doctor), Miss Marple, Yes, Prime Minister, Bergerac, The Bill, Casualty, Holby City and Sea of Souls.

His films included The Plague of the Zombies (1966), Omen III: The Final Conflict (1981), Rise and Fall of Idi Amin (1981), White Mischief (1987), Cry Freedom (1987), Shooting Fish (1997), Wondrous Oblivion (2003) and Shooting Dogs (2005).

He featured in the Channel 4 documentary Random (2011), and in the BBC Three drama Being Human (2012) as Leo, an aged and dying werewolf.

Mahoney's last TV appearance was in the Tracy Beaker CBBC spin-off, The Dumping Ground, as Henry Lawrence, the grandfather of Charlie Morris (Emily Burnett).

Campaign work
Mahoney was a long-standing campaigner for racial equality within the acting profession, as a member of the Equity Afro-Asian Committee (previously called the Coloured Actors Committee until he renamed it), founding Performers Against Racism to defend Equity policy on South Africa, and as co-creator, with Mike Phillips and Taiwo Ajai, of the UK's Black Theatre Workshop in 1976.

Personal life
Mahoney was married in 1971 and later divorced, and had daughters. For decades a resident in Hampstead, Mahoney lived on the corner of Gayton Road and Willow Road, and was a regular in local pubs. He was athletic and played cricket as a fast bowler, joining the Gentlemen of Hampstead club.

Death
In 2016, Mahoney was diagnosed with cancer. He died on 28 June 2020, aged 81. His funeral took place at Hampstead Parish, attended by his friends and community.

Legacy
The Louis Mahoney Scholarships at the Royal Central School of Speech and Drama were initiated in his memory to encourage applications from Black and global majority students, beginning from the academic year 2021/22, supporting one undergraduate and one postgraduate candidate in each of the following three years.

Filmography

Theatre

Year/Show/Role/Theatre : Talking To You / Various / Duke of York’s Theatre ; Cato Street /  Conspirator / Young Vic ;  Jesus Christ Superstar /  Caiaphas /  Gaiety Theatre, Dublin ; Murderous Angels/ Diallo Diop / Gaiety Theatre, Dublin ; 1967 / Coriolanus / Lieutenant to Aufidius / Royal Shakespeare Company ; 1967 / Romeo and Juliet / Musician 1 / Royal Shakespeare Company ; 1970 / Robinson Crusoe/Friday / Mercury Theatre; Night And Day / President Mageeba /Watford Palace Theatre ; Hutch Builder to Her Majesty / Various / Theatre Royal, Drury Lane ;  White Devil / Antonelli / Oxford Playhouse ;  I am Tomarienka / Various / Watermill Theatre ; 1990 / Desire / Kindo / Almeida ; 1997 / Romeo & Juliet / Friar John and Monatague / Royal Shakespeare Company ; 2007 / Generations /Grandfather / Young Vic ; 2009 / As You Like It / Adam and Sir Oliver Martext / Leicester Curve ; 2009 / The Observer / Muturi and Dr Durami/ Royal National Theatre ; 2010 / Love The Sinner / Paul / Royal National Theatre ; 2011 / Truth & Reconciliation / Rwandan Grandfather / Royal Court ;  2013 / Feast / Papa Legba / Young Vic and Royal Court ; 2018 / Allelujah! / Neville / Bridge Theatre

References

External links
 
 

1938 births
2020 deaths
Anti-apartheid activists
Black British activists
Black British male actors
British male film actors
British male television actors
Deaths from cancer in England
Gambian activists
Gambian actors
Gambian Creole people
Gambian emigrants to England
People from Banjul
People from Hampstead
Wesleyan Methodists